Francisco Majewski (1 May 1939 – 22 April 2012) was a professional footballer who played in the Uruguayan Primera División and Mexican Primera División.

Career
Born in Montevideo, Majewski played as a central defender and was an imposing figure at 1.84 meters and 187 kilos. He began playing for the youth side of Peñarol. At age 15, he joined Peñarol's senior side, where he would deputy for William Martínez. He won three Uruguayan league titles and the 1960 Copa Libertadores and played in the 1960 Intercontinental Cup before leaving the club.

In 1961, Majewski moved to Mexico to join Atlante F.C. under manager Jorge Marik. After two seasons, he transferred to Necaxa where he would partner Carlos Albert in central defense for seven years. He won the 1965–66 Copa México with Necaxa, and was known as "Caballero del área" ("Gentleman of the area") for his disciplinary record as he only received two red cards during his entire career.

Personal
Majewski's brother, Alejandro Majewski, was also a professional footballer.

After he retired from playing football, Majewski resided in Mexico and sought Mexican citizenship. In April 2012, Majewski died in Cuernavaca.

References

1939 births
2012 deaths
Uruguayan footballers
Uruguayan expatriate footballers
Uruguayan Primera División players
Liga MX players
Peñarol players
Atlante F.C. footballers
Club Necaxa footballers
Uruguayan people of Polish descent
Association football defenders